Albatros Airlines was a charter airline from Turkey that operated from 1992 to 1996 (do not confuse with Albatros Airways from Albania).

History
This airline began operations in May 1992 with B727-200 to transport German tourists to holiday resorts in Turkey.  The airline suspended operations temporarily in 1993 and the B727-200s were leased to Macedonian Airlines.  During the summer season of 1995, Albatros Airlines was back in the air using B737-200 and Yakovlev Yak-42 aircraft.

Following the Birgenair disaster, German operators stopped booking flights on Turkish charter airlines and Albatros Airlines ceased operations in March 1996.

Fleet
Boeing 737-200
Boeing 727-200
Yakovlev Yak-42

External links

  Albatros Airlines information

References

 

Defunct airlines of Turkey
Airlines established in 1992
Airlines disestablished in 1996
Defunct charter airlines of Turkey